Kathryn Lindsay Blacker is the Chief Executive of York Museums Trust.

Biography
Blacker studied MA modern history at the University of Oxford. She worked as a producer for BBC Sport and was Deputy Director of the National Media Museum before, in 2013, joining York Minster as Chapter Steward. In August 2022 she was announced as the new CEO of York Museums Trust, succeeding Reyahn King in the role. 

Blacker is a governor of the Pathfinder Multi-Academy Trust.

References

Living people
British curators
People from Beverley
York Museums Trust people
1976 births
British television producers
Directors of museums in the United Kingdom